Tritoniella gnathodentata is a species of the nudibranch genus Tritoniella.

Distribution

Ecology
Its diet consists of the gorgonian soft coral belonging to the family Primnoidae.

Etymology 
The species name stems from the diagnostic character of dentition on the masticatory border of the jaws.

References 

Gastropods described in 2022
Tritoniidae